Carlos "Batman" Buttice (17 December 1942 in Monte Grande, Argentina – 3 August 2018) was a football Goalkeeper. Buttice played for most of his career in clubs of Argentina, Brazil and Chile.In Chile Buttice played for Unión Española. He was part of the 1977 Unión Española team that won the Primera División de Chile.

Career
Buttice made 29 league appearances for Gimnasia y Esgrima de La Plata during the 1976 tournament.

Titles

References

1942 births
2018 deaths
Argentine footballers
Argentine expatriate footballers
Club de Gimnasia y Esgrima La Plata footballers
Club Atlético Colón footballers
San Lorenzo de Almagro footballers
Club Atlético Atlanta footballers
Club Atlético Banfield footballers
Club Atlético Huracán footballers
Club Atlético Los Andes footballers
Unión Española footballers
Chilean Primera División players
Argentine Primera División players
Expatriate footballers in Chile
Expatriate footballers in Brazil
Association football goalkeepers
Sportspeople from Buenos Aires Province